Crassula is a genus of succulent plants containing about 200 accepted species, including the popular jade plant (Crassula ovata). They are members of the stonecrop family (Crassulaceae) and are native to many parts of the globe, but cultivated varieties originate almost exclusively from species from the Eastern Cape of South Africa.

Crassulas are usually propagated by stem or leaf cuttings. Most cultivated forms will tolerate some small degree of frost, but extremes of cold or heat will cause them to lose foliage and die.

Taxonomy 

Crassula was first formally described by Carl Linnaeus in 1753 with 10 species.

Etymology 
The name crassula comes from the Latin adjective crassus, meaning thick, referring to the thickening of the succulent leaves.

List of selected species 
Crassula alata
Crassula alba
Crassula alpestris (Sand-Coated Crassula)
Crassula alstonii
Crassula aquatica (common pigmyweed, water pygmyweed)
Crassula arborescens (silver dollar plant, beestebul)
Crassula atropurpurea
Crassula ausensis
Crassula ausensis ssp. titanopsis
Crassula barbata  
Crassula barklyi (rattlesnake tail, wurmplakkie)
Crassula biplanata 
Crassula brevifolia 
Crassula capitella  
Crassula capitella ssp. thyrsiflora (aanteel-poprosie)  
Crassula clavata
Crassula closiana
Crassula coccinea
Crassula colligata
Crassula colorata (dense stonecrop)
Crassula columella (silinderplakkie)
Crassula columnaris (koesnaatjie) 
Crassula connata (sand pygmyweed)
Crassula corallina 
Crassula cornuta
Crassula cotyledonis
Crassula cultrata (plakkiebos)
Crassula deceptor
Crassula decidua (norsveld plakkie)
Crassula decumbens (scilly pigmyweed)
Crassula dejecta
Crassula deltoidea (silver beads, gruisplakkie)
Crassula drummondii (small-leaf pygmyweed)
Crassula dubia
Crassula elegans (elegant crassula)
Crassula erosula
Crassula exilis
Crassula exilis ssp. sedifolia
Crassula expansa
Crassula exserta
Crassula extrorsa
Crassula falcata
Crassula garibina
Crassula gillii 
Crassula globularioides
Crassula glomerata
Crassula grisea
Crassula helmsii (swamp stonecrop)
Crassula herrei
Crassula hirtipes
Crassula humbertii
Crassula hystrix
Crassula lactea (tailor's patch, Knysna crassula)
Crassula lanceolata
Crassula longipes (smallseed pygmyweed)
Crassula marchandii
Crassula marnieriana
Crassula mesembryanthemoides
Crassula mesembryanthemopsis
Crassula milfordiae
Crassula moschata (musky stonecrop, shore stonecrop)
Crassula multicava (fairy crassula)
Crassula muscosa (rattail crassula, watch chain, lizard's tail, zipper plant; syn. C. lycopodioides)
Crassula namaquensis
Crassula namaquensis ssp. comptonii
Crassula natans
Crassula nealeana
Crassula nudicaulis 
Crassula nudicaulis var. herrei
Crassula nudicaulis var. platyphylla
Crassula obovata
Crassula obovata var. dregeana
Crassula orbicularis
Crassula ovata (jade plant; syn. C. argentea, C. portulacea)
Crassula ovata var. cristata
Crassula ovata var. monstruosa
Crassula parvisepala
Crassula pedicellosa
Crassula peduncularis (purple stonecrop)
Crassula pellucida
Crassula pellucida var. marginalis
Crassula pentandra
Crassula perfoliata
Crassula perforata (string of buttons, sosatieplakkie)
Crassula picturata
Crassula plegmatoides
Crassula pruinosa (skurwemannetjie)
Crassula pubescens (Jersey pigmyweed)
Crassula pubescens ssp. radicans
Crassula pubescens ssp. rattrayi
Crassula pyramidalis 
Crassula radicans (red carpet)
Crassula rogersii
Crassula rubricaulis
Crassula rupestris (rosary plant, kebab bush, concertina plant, sosatiebos, inrygertjie)
Crassula rupestris ssp. marnierana
Crassula saginoides (wrinkle-seed pygmyweed)
Crassula sarcocaulis (bonsai crassula)
Crassula sarmentosa
Crassula schmidtii
Crassula sericea
Crassula sericea var. hottentotta
Crassula setulosa (South African pygmyweed)
Crassula sieberiana (Austral stonecrop)
Crassula socialis
Crassula solierii (smoothseed pygmyweed)
Crassula streyi 
Crassula subaphylla
Crassula susannae
Crassula swaziensis
Crassula tecta
Crassula tetragona
Crassula tetramera
Crassula thunbergiana
Crassula tillaea (moss pygmyweed)
Crassula umbella
Crassula viridis (pricklyseed pygmyweed)
Crassula volkensii

List of selected cultivars 

Crassula 'Buddha's Temple'
Crassula 'Coralita' 
Crassula 'Dorothy'
Crassula 'Emerald'
Crassula 'Fallwood'
Crassula 'Ivory Pagoda'
Crassula 'Justus Corderoy'
Crassula 'Morgan's Beauty'
Crassula 'Moonglow'
Crassula 'Petite Bicolor,' sometimes sold as Sedum 'Little Missy,' a cultivar of Crassula pellucida var. marginalis 
Crassula 'Tom Thumb'

Gallery

References

Bibliography 

 , see also Species Plantarum

External links

 
Crassulaceae genera